Gary Senga Kikaya (born 4 February 1980) is a retired sprinter from the Democratic Republic of the Congo. He competed in the 400 m event at the 2004 and 2008 Olympics, but failed to reach the finals.

Education
Kikaya is the son of Kikaya bin Karubi, a former Information Minister of the Congo, and a former Special Assistant to President Joseph Kabila. At the age of 12 his family moved to Johannesburg, South Africa, where his father served as the Congolese Ambassador to South Africa. Like most Southern African youths, his sporting interests began with rugby and soccer. He attended Queens High School in Johannesburg where he only turned to athletics as a senior in 1999 after watching the World Cup, in Johannesburg, the year before. He achieved the school's highest accolade in the form of a School Honours Blazer. He received a scholarship to study at Rand Afrikaans University (RAU), now the University of Johannesburg (UJ), was thereafter recruited by the University of Tennessee. Kikaya graduated in sociology at the University of Tennessee in Knoxville, Tennessee.

Achievements
2002 NCAA champion indoor and outdoor in 400 meters
2003 NCAA champion indoor in 400 meters
2004 IAAF World Indoor Championships – bronze medal
2006 Africa Athletics Championship – gold medal
Kikaya became the fastest non American athlete of all time (11th fastest man over 400m at the time, now 13th), running a new African record of 44.10 seconds to come second to Jeremy Wariner at the World Athletics Final 2006 in Stuttgart.

References

External links

1980 births
Living people
Sportspeople from Kinshasa
Democratic Republic of the Congo male sprinters
Athletes (track and field) at the 2004 Summer Olympics
Athletes (track and field) at the 2008 Summer Olympics
Olympic athletes of the Democratic Republic of the Congo
World Athletics Indoor Championships medalists
21st-century Democratic Republic of the Congo people